The 2019 Armenian Supercup was the 22nd Armenian Supercup, an annual football match played between the winners of the previous season's Premier League, Ararat-Armenia, and the previous season's Armenian Cup, Alashkert, with the former winning 3–2 after extra time.

Background

Ararat-Armenia won their first League title since their formation prior to the 2017–18 season.

Alashkert won their first Armenian Cup title after beating Lori 1–0 in the final.

Match details

See also
2018–19 Armenian Premier League
2018–19 Armenian Cup

Notes

References

Football in Armenia